Phalonidia melanothicta is a species of moth of the family Tortricidae. It is found in China (Anhui, Fujian, Guangxi, Guizhou, Hubei, Hunan, Jiangxi, Ningxia, Sichuan, Yunnan, Zhejiang) and Japan.

The wingspan is 8.5−13 mm.

References

Moths described in 1927
Phalonidia